is a former Japanese football player.

Playing career
Soma was born in Kawasaki on December 10, 1981. After playing for Verdy Kawasaki (later Tokyo Verdy) youth team, he went on to Kokushikan University. When he was a Kokushikan University student, he joined J1 League club Tokyo Verdy in 2003. In September 2004, he became a regular left side back instead regular player Atsuhiro Miura left Verdy for Japan national team. Verdy won the champions in 2004 Emperor's Cup. Although Soma also played as regular player in 2005, Verdy finished at the 17th place in 2005 season and was relegated to J2 League.

In 2006, Soma moved to J1 club Urawa Reds. He played many matches as substitute left side midfielder because Alessandro Santos played as regular player. In 2007, Although Santos left the club, Soma could not play many matches behind Tadaaki Hirakawa. In 2008, Soma became a regular player as left side midfielder. Reds won the champions in 2006 J1 League, 2006 Emperor's Cup and 2007 AFC Champions League in 3 seasons.

On January 12, 2009, after a three-year contract with the Urawa Reds had come to an end, Soma decided to forgo contract extension talks to pursue a career overseas in Europe. On January 29, 2009 Soma signed with Marítimo of the Primeira Liga, on a one-and-a-half year contract. At the end of this contract, he left Portugal and signed with 2. Bundesliga club Energie Cottbus.

In July 2011, Soma returned to Japan and joined J1 League club Vissel Kobe. Although he could not play many matches for injury in 2011, he played as regular left side back in 2012. However Vissel finished at the 16th place in 2012 season and was relegated to J2 League. Although his opportunity to play decreased for injury in 2013, Vissel was returned to J1 in a year. After six seasons with Vissel, he announced his retirement.

Club statistics

(*) Includes 3 matches at FIFA Club World Cup

Awards and honours

Club
Tokyo Verdy
 Emperor's Cup: 2004

Urawa Reds
 AFC Champions League: 2007
 J1 League: 2006
 Emperor's Cup: 2006
 Japanese Super Cup: 2006

References

External links

1981 births
Living people
Kokushikan University alumni
Association football people from Kanagawa Prefecture
Japanese footballers
J1 League players
J2 League players
Primeira Liga players
2. Bundesliga players
Tokyo Verdy players
Urawa Red Diamonds players
C.S. Marítimo players
FC Energie Cottbus players
Vissel Kobe players
Japanese expatriate footballers
Expatriate footballers in Portugal
Expatriate footballers in Germany
Japanese expatriate sportspeople in Portugal
Japanese expatriate sportspeople in Germany
Association football fullbacks
Association football midfielders